The Guinean horseshoe bat (Rhinolophus guineensis) is a species of bat in the family Rhinolophidae. It is found in Ivory Coast, Guinea, Liberia, Senegal, and Sierra Leone. Its natural habitats are subtropical and tropical forests, moist savanna, caves, and other subterranean habitats.

Taxonomy and etymology
It was described by M. Eisentraut in 1960 as a new subspecies of the Lander's horseshoe bat with a trinomen of Rhinolophus landeri guineensis. The holotype was collected near Kolenté, Guinea. In 1978, it was elevated to full species status.

Description
It is considered "medium-sized" for an African horseshoe bat.

Range and habitat
Its range includes several countries in West Africa such as Ivory Coast, Guinea, Liberia, Senegal, and Sierra Leone.

Conservation
As of 2008, it is listed as an endangered species by the IUCN.

References

Rhinolophidae
Mammals described in 1960
Taxonomy articles created by Polbot
Bats of Africa